Samson Roosevelt Faical Kuessi Johnson (born July 28, 2002) is a Togolese college basketball player for the UConn Huskies of the Big East Conference.

He has been considered as the top incoming basketball recruit in UConn’s 2021 class.

High school career
At The Patrick School, he played under coach Chris Chavannes who praised Johnson’s work ethic. He led his team to a 14–1 overall record. Johnson showed improvement as a junior as a role player on a team led by Adama Sanogo, who later completed an exceptional freshman season on the 2020–21 UConn Huskies men's basketball team. In October 2020, at a Slam16 all-star game at Gauchos Gym in The Bronx, Johnson wound up with 12 points, eight rebounds and six blocks to notch Co-Most Valuable Players honors for the game. He worked out with the Northeast Basketball Club, a program in northern New Jersey that often featured some of the state’s top committed prospects and current collegiate players.

Recruiting
In November 2020, Johnson signed his national letter of intent to play for UConn Huskies men's basketball program. 
A week after his recruitment, Johnson was rated as No. 39 in the nation (according to ESPN — ahead of both fellow UConn commits Rahsool Diggins and Jordan Hawkins, No.’s 56 and 57, respectively).
Johnson moved up in the 247Sports recruiting site’s composite rankings, as well, from No. 76 back in November to No. 63.

Player profile
Johnson’s former coach Chavannes reported, “you see a guy that can just dominate a game on both ends of the floor, in a matter of seconds. He can shoot the 3 in transition, follow-up dunks, clean up the boards, block shots. He can literally just dominate a game.”

Jay David, Johnson’s coach at the youth basketball program NY Jayhawks AAU stated “..he can guard multiple positions.” Yet, in May 2021, David stressed that Johnson needed to add more strength to compete better in the very physical Big East Conference.

References

External links
UConn Huskies bio

2002 births
Living people
Power forwards (basketball)
Centers (basketball)
Sportspeople from Lomé
Togolese expatriates in the United States
Togolese men's basketball players
21st-century Togolese people